MOL Comfort was a 2008-built Bahamian-flagged post-Panamax container ship chartered by Mitsui O.S.K. Lines. The vessel was launched in 2008 as APL Russia and sailed under that name until 2012, when the ship was renamed to MOL Comfort. The aft section sank on 27 June and the bow section, after having been destroyed by fire, on 11 July.

General characteristics 

She measured 86,692 in gross tonnage and 48,825 in net tonnage, and had a deadweight tonnage of 90,613 tonnes. The container capacity of the ship, measured in twenty-foot equivalent units (TEU), was 8,110 of which 4,616 TEU is stored on the deck and 3,494 TEU in the holds.

Like most large container ships, MOL Comfort was propelled by a single low-speed two-stroke crosshead diesel engine coupled to a fixed-pitch propeller. She also had six auxiliary diesel generators with a combined output of 14,625kVA.

The hatch side coamings in modern container ships are subjected to the highest stress of all structural members in the ship. This is due to the large openings in the strength deck needed for loading and unloading containers in the cargo holds. MOL Comforts sister ship, 2007-built , was the first container ship classified by Nippon Kaiji Kyokai to use ultra-high-strength steel with a yield strength of 470MPa in these structures to reduce the steel weight by avoiding extreme plate thicknesses.

Career 

One of twelve ships of similar design, MOL Comfort was laid down at Mitsubishi Heavy Industries Nagasaki shipyard in Japan on 23 August 2007 and launched on 8 March 2008 as APL Russia for charter to APL (formerly American President Lines). She was completed on 14 July 2008. On 1 June 2012, APL Russia was transferred to Mitsui O.S.K. Lines' Europe-Asia route and renamed MOL Comfort.

Shipwreck 

The vessel was underway from Singapore to Jeddah, Saudi Arabia, with a cargo of 4,382 containers equivalent to 7,041 TEU. The crew of 26—11 Russians, one Ukrainian and 14 Filipinos—abandoned the ship and were rescued from two liferafts and a lifeboat by three other container vessels, German-flagged container ship  of Hapag-Lloyd, Panamaian-flagged Hanjin Beijing of now-defunct Hanjin Shipping and ZIM's ZIM India, sailed under British flag. These vessels were diverted to the site of incident by ICG Mumbai. After the structural failure, both sections remained afloat with the majority of the cargo intact and began drifting in an east-northeast direction. Smit Salvage Singapore was contracted to tow the sections to safety.

On 24 June, four oceangoing tugboats arrived at the scene and began towing the bow section to safety. Before salvage operations of the stern section could begin, water ingress was reported on 26 June. Some of the approximately 1,700 containers on board were later confirmed floating near the site. While no major oil leak was reported, the stern section was said to contain about 1,500 tons of fuel.

On 2 July, the tow of the bow section broke free in bad weather, but the towing line was reattached the next day. On 6 July, a fire broke out in the rear of the bow section. Unable to control the blaze in bad weather, the salvage vessels requested help from the Indian Coast Guard patrol boat Samudra Prahari with external firefighting equipment. By 10 July, most of the 2,400 containers on board had been destroyed by fire. No spill apart from a thin oil film on the surface was reported. The cause of the fire is unknown.

The exact cause of the accident is not known. On 4 July, Mitsui O.S.K. Lines appointed Lloyd's Register to support investigations into the cause of the incident. As a precaution, the sister ships of MOL Comfort were withdrawn from the same route and their hull structures will be upgraded to increase the longitudinal strength. In addition, operational changes will be implemented to reduce stress on the vessels' hulls.

The sinking of MOL Comfort cost insurers between 300 and 400 million dollars in claims. The hull and machinery of the vessel were insured for $66 million. By December 2014, the insurers (Tokio Marine & Nichido Fire Insurance Co.) were among 100 companies, including Mitsui O.S.K. Lines Ltd., who had launched lawsuits against MHI, reportedly on the grounds that the accident and consequent loss of ship and cargo was caused by a design flaw in the freighter.

, the loss of all 4,293 containers on board is the largest number of containers lost in a single event.

References 

Container ships
Ships built by Mitsubishi Heavy Industries
Maritime incidents in 2013
Ships sunk with no fatalities
Shipwrecks in the Indian Ocean
2008 ships
Ship fires
Mitsubishi Heavy Industries